The Raid on Santorini took place on 24 April 1944 as part of the Mediterranean Campaign in World War II. It was conducted by the British Special Boat Service, against the mixed German and Italian garrison on the island of Santorini (Thera) in the Aegean Sea. The raid was made in tandem with similar operations at the islands of Ios, Mykonos and Amorgos that aimed to destroy Axis naval observation posts and radio stations on the Cycladic islands.

Background
During the winter of 1943, the Germans had secured their control of the Aegean archipelago. In spring 1944, they still maintained appreciable garrisons on Greek isles. The British wished to maintain a secondary front in the Aegean, therefore, after the fall of Kos and Leros, the Middle East HQ issued orders to the SBS special forces unit to attack the garrisons of occupied Greek islands such as Santorini.

The raid
On April 19, a group of 19 commandos under Major Anders Lassen sailed from their hideout in Balisu bay, Turkey aboard two schooners. After a three-day voyage that included intermediate stops in Syrna and Anydros, the group landed on an easterly beach near cape Columbo on the night of 22 to 23. They marched towards the village of Vourvoulos and  after contacting the locals, the group hid in a nearby cave. The two schooners sought shelter in the nearby Christiana islands, southwest of Santorini. One member of the group of commandos was the Greek Lieutenant Steven Kasoulis. On April 23, Kasoulis was guided by locals to the capital Fira to gather intelligence. Based on Kasoulis' information, Lassen decided to divide his forces into three detachments. The first would attack the barracks in Fira, the second would head to the residence of the German commanding officer (Lieutenant Hesse) in Fira and attempt to capture him while the third would target the radio station in Imerovigli.  This radio had a long range and served as a relay supporting communications between Athens and Crete.

The zero hour for the attack was set to 00:45 of April 24 and the three detachments were led to their targets by local guides. The barracks were located in the centre of Fira, on the second floor of a building that housed a bank. The attackers came from two different directions and in spite of barking dogs, they managed to surprise the 40-strong garrison and eliminate most of them. During the attack, Kasoulis received a shot in the chest and died immediately. Sergeant Frank Kingston was also shot in the abdomen and succumbed to his wounds a few hours later. The attack against the German commanding officer was unsuccessful as he and a few others managed to flee unscathed. The building housing the radio installation was blown up with time bombs. The commandos escaped using their two schooners, taking with them some of the locals who had helped them.

Reprisals
On April 29, German reinforcements from the island of Milos surrounded Vourvoulos. They amassed all local men aged 14 and older and threatened them with reprisals if they did not reveal those who helped the commandos. A few villagers admitted their involvement and were sent to the firing squad. In all, a total of five men, among them the village mayor, were executed. It is unclear why the rest of the villagers and the village itself was spared. It has been claimed that this was the result of a letter written to Lt Hesse by Lassen, warning him that his name was known to the Allies who would hold him accountable for any reprisals he ordered. A monument commemorating the victims has been erected in Vourvoulos.

Aftermath
Two commandos died in the operation and five civilians were shot in reprisal. Another 13 civilians from Imerovigli who were hoping to sack German provisions in the radio building died when the explosives installed in it went off. The number of German casualties was around 40 and 19 were taken prisoners. Due to its violence, the operation became known as Lassen's Bloodbath. This and similar operations forced the German General Kleemann to instruct his troops that "[they were] living in an enemy country" and reinforce the Aegean garrisons by 4,000 men. These forces remained tied down in place for the rest of the war, depriving other fronts of their services.
In August 1944, Kasoulis was posthumously awarded the Greek Cross of Valour.

See also
Raid on Symi

References

1944 in Greece
Conflicts in 1944
Operations involving British special forces
Military raids
World War II British Commando raids
Battles and operations of World War II involving Greece
Battles and operations of World War II involving Germany
Battles and operations of World War II involving Italy
Nazi war crimes in Greece
History of Santorini
Amphibious operations of World War II
April 1944 events
Amphibious operations involving the United Kingdom